Nicholas Anthony Bollea (born July 27, 1990), formerly known as Nick Hogan, is an American reality television personality known for his appearances on the reality show Hogan Knows Best (and its spinoff, Brooke Knows Best) alongside his father, mother, and older sister.

Bollea was involved in a car crash in which he crashed into a tree as result of driving under the influence of alcohol and racing his automobile on August 26, 2007. He spent May 9, 2008, to October 21, 2008, in Pinellas County Jail as a result. The passenger in Bollea's car, John Graziano, was seriously injured and suffered massive brain damage.

Motorsports 
Bollea earned a Formula D competition license in 2006 from Formula Drift, the only professional drifting series in North America, and competed in one of their competitions, the event in Atlanta on May 12, 2007.

Bollea was active in the NOPI Drift series, qualified 10th at the Denver NOPI drift event of 2007, and placed third at their Pittsburgh event. Bollea occasionally attended amateur drifting competitions. According to Chris Tyler, a drift event organizer, Bollea attended an event the Friday prior to the crash of Nick's Toyota Supra. Bollea did not compete; he gave drifting demonstrations between the runs of competitors.

Bollea's celebrity status and enthusiasm for drifting attracted sponsors. He was briefly signed to Dodge, but company spokesman Todd Goyer said that he "is not a Dodge driver or a Mopar driver", and that his relationship with Dodge/Mopar ended two months prior to his 2007 crash. He was sponsored for the 2007 season by Polaroid, Mac Tools, BF Goodrich and Sparco. These companies are still listed on the NOPI website as sponsors of Nick's drift car, but Polaroid VP of marketing Cheryl Mau said, "We do not have a signed sponsorship agreement with Nick Hogan for the 2008 race season."

Bollea had two Dodge Vipers with steering modified to enhance their drifting capability, but his last competition vehicle was a Nissan 350Z.
John Graziano (the veteran Marine injured in the Supra crash) and Danny Jacobs (the driver of the silver Viper, seen with the Supra at the time of the crash) worked in Nick Bollea's pit crew during 2007 in St. Louis, Denver and Los Angeles. Barry Lawrence, the passenger in the aforementioned Viper, was also a member of Bollea's pit crew.

Vehicular incidents 
On September 13, 2006, in Bay Harbor Islands, Florida, Bollea was driving a yellow 2001 Lamborghini Diablo VT owned by Cecile Barker (chairman of SoBe Entertainment, the record label attached to his sister) when it caught on fire. Miami-Dade Fire Rescue spokesman Paul Perry said, "It was a normal car fire. It happens a bunch of times every day and nobody notices."

On September 17, 2006, Bollea was stopped twice driving between Miami and Tampa. He was warned the first time and ticketed the second for going  in a  zone. In an August 2007 interview with Rides, Bollea said he was driving  in a  zone. His mother said the interview was exaggerated.

On February 8, 2007, he was ticketed in Miami-Dade County, Florida for driving  in a  zone, and on April 25, 2007, he was ticketed and received four points on his license for driving  in a  zone in Osceola County. On August 10, 2007, he was ticketed in Pinellas Park after being clocked going  in a  construction zone.

Toyota Supra crash 
On the evening of August 26, 2007, just 16 days after his fourth speeding ticket in 11 months, the 17-year-old Bollea was involved in a serious crash in Clearwater, Florida. Bollea and three members of the pit crew for his drifting team, using two of his father's cars — a yellow Toyota Supra and a silver Dodge Viper — were traveling to a steakhouse when the single-vehicle crash occurred at Court Street and Missouri Avenue, near downtown Clearwater. The yellow Supra, which Bollea had been driving in the outside lane, fishtailed and spun across the road, crashing into the median strip and into a palm tree. The impact destroyed the car.

Bollea and his passenger, 22-year-old John Graziano, were flown to Bayfront Medical Center in St. Petersburg, Florida. Bollea was released from care on August 27 and said to be "OK". Graziano, a U.S. Marine and a member of Bollea's pit crew, was not wearing a seatbelt. The eye and brain injuries he sustained are expected to leave him in a nursing home for the rest of his life. In September 2009, Graziano returned to his home where he continued to receive full-time care.

Criminal charges 
Bollea was charged with several violations for the crash, including a felony. He turned himself in to authorities on Wednesday, November 7, 2007, and was released within hours on $10,000 bail. Bollea was charged with reckless driving involving serious bodily injury (a 3rd degree felony, punishable by up to 5 years in prison plus fines), use of a motor vehicle in commission of a felony, a person under the age of 21 operating a vehicle with a blood alcohol level of 0.02% or higher, and illegal window tint. Two hours after the wreck, Bollea's blood alcohol content was 0.055%.

Eyewitnesses claimed the cars were racing. The official police report says that the two cars were racing, but that Jacobs' actions were not a direct cause of the crash.

Prior to the trial, Bollea's lawyer said that the crash was not the result of speeding, emphasizing that Bollea was wearing a seatbelt and Graziano was not. Bollea's lawyer released a store's surveillance video from earlier in the day which he claimed could disprove the police report that Bollea was driving at least 50% faster than the posted speed limit. The Graziano family denied rumors of a civil suit, but later the Graziano family lawyers suggested a civil suit against the Bolleas to pay for Graziano's lifetime medical care.

Incarceration 
On May 9, 2008, Bollea entered a no contest plea and was sentenced to eight months in Pinellas County Jail. The sentence also called for Bollea to serve five years of probation, 500 community service hours, and his driver's license was suspended for three years.

After a public records request, Pinellas County Sheriff's Office released audio tapes of Bollea's jail phone conversation from his overnight incarceration several months earlier. The conversation included Bollea saying that crash victim John Graziano was a "negative person." The press was critical of the excerpts blaming the crash victim. Bollea later sued the Pinellas County Sheriff's Office for releasing the tapes of his phone conversations.

Bollea was separated from the general jail population because he was a minor. His attorneys asked for reconsideration of his sentence, seeking temporary house arrest until he was 18 years old. On June 3, 2008, the motion was denied. Soon after, Bollea was moved to join three other juvenile inmates. On July 27 (his 18th birthday), he was moved to Pinellas County Jail general population.

On October 21, 2008, Bollea was released from the Pinellas County Jail due to "good time" credit and moved to his mother's home in Clearwater, Florida.

On May 4, 2012, Bollea was granted early release from felony probation.

Later life 
Bollea had been in a long-time relationship with model Breana Tiesi from 2008 and 2015, followed by a relationship with popular Instagram model Brit Manuela between 2017 and 2018. Since 2019, he has been with pornographic actress Tana Lea. In October 2014, several publications named Bollea as the first male star to be directly targeted in the 2014 celebrity photo leaks, which included pictures of his mother, Linda, in a thong bikini. However Bollea denied the authenticity of some of the pictures.

References

External links 

Hogan Knows Best characters: Nick
St. Petersburg Times page on the Bollea case

1990 births
Living people
21st-century American criminals
Actors from Pinellas County, Florida
American male criminals
American prisoners and detainees
Bollea family
Criminals from California
Criminals from Florida
Criminals from Los Angeles
Participants in American reality television series
Prisoners and detainees of Florida
Racing drivers from Los Angeles
Racing drivers from Miami
Racing drivers from Tampa, Florida
Sportspeople from Clearwater, Florida
Television personalities from Florida
Television personalities from Los Angeles

fi:Hulk Hogan#Perhe